Linton Clarke Freeman (1927 – August 17, 2018) was an American structuralist sociologist known for his pioneering work in social networks. He was an emeritus professor of Sociology at the University of California, Irvine. Freeman developed the first measure of betweenness centrality. He was the founding editor of the journal Social Networks which began publishing in 1979.

Freeman died on August 17, 2018 at the age of 91.

References

External links
Linton C Freeman - Google Scholar Citations

1927 births
2018 deaths
People from Chicago
American sociologists
University of California, Irvine faculty
University of Hawaiʻi faculty
Northwestern University alumni